Sigurd Karsten Asserson (25 June 1882 – 19 July 1937 in Oslo) was a Norwegian civil servant.

Asserson was born in Sandnes, southwestern Norway. He was the son of captain Kristian Asserson (1838–1916) and Anna Anfindsen (1850–1926).

He served as director of the Norwegian Directorate of Fisheries from 1918 to 1937. He was a Knight of the Order of Polonia Restituta (Polish), Commander of the Order of Vasa (Swedish) and Al Merito Civil (Spanish), and a Grand Officer of the Belgian Order of Leopold. He died of a heart attack in July 1937 in Oslo on his way to Copenhagen.

In 1911, he married Ingrid Haabeth (1885–1973), daughter of businessman Arne Haabeth (1849–1927) and Olava Nielsen (1864–1927).

Works 

 Sildefiskeriernes Historie, Bergen 1914
 Fremtidslinjen for Trondhjems ferskfiskhandel, særtrykk av Aarsberetning fra Trondhjems fiskeriselskab 1915, Trondheim 1915
 Torskefiskeriene og handelen med klippfisk og tørrfisk, særtrykk av Aarsberetning vedkommende Norges fiskerier 1928, Bergen 1928

References

Further reading 

 K. Fasting: Vintersildsoga. Sild og samfunn gjennom hundre år, 1960
 d.s.: Feitsildsoga. Feitsild- og loddefiske gjennom århundrene, Bergen 1962
 L. Nordstrand: Fiskeridirektoratets historie 1900–1977,
 P. Frølich: Vennlig i form, sterk i sak. Fiskeridirektør Sigurd Karsten Asserson 1882–1937, Bergen 1991

1882 births
1937 deaths
Norwegian civil servants
Directors of government agencies of Norway
People from Sandnes

Knights of the Order of Polonia Restituta
Commanders of the Order of Vasa